Bathyraja panthera, the leopard skate, is a species of cartilaginous fish in the family Arhynchobatidae. It is a moderately large species with a short snout and wide mouth. The dorsal surface is pale greenish-brown, with speckling, round black spots and yellow blotches, giving it its specific name panthera from its resemblance to a leopard skin. It is an egg-bearing species, the eggs being enclosed in egg capsules with horns at the corners.

Description
This moderately large skate has a disc that is 1.3 times as broad as long. The total length (TL) of the described species is between 197 mm and 1110 mm, the disc length is between 514 mm and 586 mm, the disc width is between 640 mm and 743 mm and the tail length is between 440 mm and 541 mm. The snout is short, the mouth width is about 15.6% of the disc width, with about 34 (31-42) thorns on the mid-dorsal line from the nuchal to the tip of the tail (nuchal: 4 (2-5), mid-dorsal: 7 (6-10), scapular: 2 (1-2), tail: 22 (19-28)).

The species is oviparous. The egg capsules are large (between 106 mm and 134 mm) with a horn at each corner.

The background colour is light greenish brown, with vermiculated and round black spots and yellow blotches.

This species was named after the generic name for the leopard (Felidae), because the dorsal coloration of the species is often characterized by rosettes of black spots surrounding yellow blotches.

The holotype is housed in the University of Washington, College of Ocean and Fishery Sciences, Seattle, USA (collection number UW 116980).

Distribution 
This species is known from the western Aleutian Islands (Pacific Ocean, Bering Sea) or on Petrel Bank between longitudes 170° E and 179° W. All described specimens were collected at depths ranging from 51 m to 258 m.

References 
Orr, J.W., Stevenson, D.E., Hoff, G.R., Spies, I. & McEachran, J.D. (2011): Bathyraja panthera, a new species of skate (Rajidae: Arhynchobatinae) from the western Aleutian Islands, and resurrection of the subgenus Arctoraja Ishiyama. NOAA Professional Paper NMFS, 11: 50pp

External links 
 Species Description of Bathyraja panthera at www.shark-references.com

Rajidae
Bathyraja
Taxa named by James Wilder Orr
Taxa named by Duane E. Stevenson
Taxa named by Gerald Raymond Hoff
Taxa named by Ingrid Brigette Spies
Taxa named by John D. McEachran
Fish described in 2011